Josefa Salas (born 10 October 1995) is a Chilean field hockey player.

Salas first represented the Chile senior team at the 2013 Pan American Cup in Mendoza, Argentina. She made her junior debut at the 2016 Pan-Am Junior Championship.

Salas was part of the Chile team at the 2017 Pan American Cup. She scored the first goal in the team's historic 4–3 victory over the United States.

References

1995 births
Living people
Chilean female field hockey players
South American Games gold medalists for Chile
South American Games silver medalists for Chile
South American Games bronze medalists for Chile
South American Games medalists in field hockey
Competitors at the 2014 South American Games
Competitors at the 2018 South American Games
Competitors at the 2022 South American Games
20th-century Chilean women
21st-century Chilean women